Abhinav Sharma (born 25 December 1997) is an Indian cricketer. He made his List A debut on 22 February 2021, for Punjab in the 2020–21 Vijay Hazare Trophy.

References

External links
 

1997 births
Living people
Indian cricketers
Punjab, India cricketers
Place of birth missing (living people)